Securidaca is a genus of shrubs and lianas in the family Polygalaceae. It is native to tropical Africa, SE Asia and the Americas from Mexico and the West Indies to Paraguay.

Species
Currently recognized species are:

Securidaca acuminata A.St.-Hil.
Securidaca amazonica Chodat
Securidaca bialata Benth.
Securidaca cacumina Wurdack
Securidaca calophylla (Poepp.) S.F. Blake
Securidaca cayennensis S.F. Blake
Securidaca coriacea Bonpl.
Securidaca cristata A.C. Sm.
Securidaca divaricata Nees & Mart.
Securidaca diversifolia (L.) S.F.Blake
Securidaca dolod B.Walln.
Securidaca falcata Chodat
Securidaca fragilis B. Ståhl & B. Eriksen
Securidaca froesii Wurdack
Securidaca fruticans Wurdack
Securidaca inappendiculata Hassk.
Securidaca lanceolata A.St.-Hil.
Securidaca lateralis A.W. Benn
Securidaca leiocarpa S.F. Blake
Securidaca longifolia Poepp.
Securidaca longipedunculata Fresen.
Securidaca macrocarpa A.W. Benn.
Securidaca macrophylla (Benth.) Wurdack
Securidaca maguirei Wurdack
Securidaca marginata Benth.
Securidaca micheliana Chodat
Securidaca ovalifolia A.St.-Hil.
Securidaca paniculata Rich.
Securidaca pendula Bonpl.
Securidaca planchoniana Killip & Dugand
Securidaca prancei Wurdack
Securidaca pubescens DC.
Securidaca pubiflora Benth.
Securidaca purpurea Linden & Planch.
Securidaca pyramidalis Sprague ex Sandwith
Securidaca retusa Benth.
Securidaca savannarum Wurdack
Securidaca scandens Jacq.
Securidaca speciosa Wurdack
Securidaca spinifex Sandwith
Securidaca sylvestris Schltdl.
Securidaca tenuifolia Chodat
Securidaca tomentosa A. St.-Hil.
Securidaca trianae Killip & Dugand
Securidaca uniflora Oort
Securidaca virgata Sw.
Securidaca volubilis L.
Securidaca warmingiana Chodat
Securidaca welwitschii Oliver
Securidaca yaoshanensis K.S. Hao

References

Polygalaceae
Fabales genera
Taxonomy articles created by Polbot